This list of Elle (Canada) cover models is a catalogue of people who have appeared on the cover of the Canadian edition of Elle magazine.

1989

1990

1991

1992

1993

1994

1995

1996

1997

1998

1999

2010

2011

2012

2013

2014

2015

2016

2017

2018

2019

2020

External links
 Elle Canada
 Elle Canada at Models.com

Canada